The Speaker of the National Assembly of Azerbaijan Republic, also called Chairman of the National Assembly is the Speaker of Azerbaijani Parliament. The current Speaker is Sahiba Gafarova. According to the amendments to the Azerbaijani Constitution of 1995 and 2016, the Speaker is the forth in line of succession to presidency after the Vice President of Azerbaijan and the Prime Minister of Azerbaijan, in that sequence.

Chairmen of the National Assembly of Azerbaijan

References 

Government of Azerbaijan